Rhopalias is a genus of trematodes belonging to the monotypic family Rhopaliidae.

The species of this genus are found in America.

Species:

Rhopalias coronatus
Rhopalias macracanthus
Rhopalias oochi

References

Plagiorchiida
Plagiorchiida genera